The 2020–21 season was Cambridge United's 109th season in their history, 42nd season in the Football League and seventh consecutive season in EFL League Two. Along with League Two, the club also participated in the FA Cup, EFL Cup and EFL Trophy.

The season covers the period from 1 July 2020 to 30 June 2021.

Transfers

Transfers in

Loans in

Loans out

Transfers out

Competitions

League Two

League table

Results summary

Results by matchday

Matches

The 2020–21 season fixtures were released on 21 August.

FA Cup

The draw for the first round was made on Monday 26, October.

EFL Cup

The first round draw was made on 18 August, live on Sky Sports, by Paul Merson. The draw for both the second and third round were confirmed on September 6, live on Sky Sports by Phil Babb.

EFL Trophy

The regional group stage draw was confirmed on 18 August. The second round draw was made by Matt Murray on 20 November, at St Andrew’s. The third round was made on 10 December 2020 by Jon Parkin.

Statistics

Appearances and goals

Last updated 9 May 2021.

|-
! colspan=14 style=background:#dcdcdc; text-align:center| Goalkeepers

|-

! colspan=14 style=background:#dcdcdc; text-align:center| Defenders

|-

! colspan=14 style=background:#dcdcdc; text-align:center| Midfielders

|-

! colspan=14 style=background:#dcdcdc; text-align:center| Forwards

|}

Top scorers
Includes all competitive matches. The list is sorted by squad number when total goals are equal.

Last updated 9 May 2021.

Cleansheets
Includes all competitive matches. The list is sorted by squad number when total cleansheets are equal.

Last updated 9 May 2021.

Disciplinary record
Includes all competitive matches.

Last updated 9 May 2021.

References

Cambridge United
Cambridge United F.C. seasons